The women's K-2 500 metres event was a pairs kayaking event conducted as part of the Canoeing at the 1976 Summer Olympics program.

Medalists

Results

Heats
The 14 crews first raced in two heats on July 28. The top three finishers from each of the heats advanced directly to the semifinals while the remaining eight teams were relegated to the repechages.

Repechages
The eight crews first raced in two repechages on July 28. The top three finishers from each of the repechages advanced directly to the semifinals.

Semifinals
The top three finishers in each of the semifinals (raced on July 30) advanced to the final.

Final
The final was held on July 30.

References
1976 Summer Olympics official report Volume 3. p. 171. 
Sports-reference.com 1976 women's K-2 500 m results.

Women's K-2 500
Olympic
Women's events at the 1976 Summer Olympics